The 2021–22 season is Odisha FC's third professional season in the Indian Super League since their establishment in 2019. The 2021–22 Indian Super League season started from 19 November 2021.

Overview
On 6 May, the club announced the appointment of David Villa as the head of Global Football Operations. The club also announced the appointment of former head coach Josep Gombau and Victor Onate as the members of Technical committee.

On 20 July, Odisha announced the appointment of Francisco "Kiko" Ramírez González as the head coach for 2021-22 Indian Super League season along with the appointment of Assistant Coach and Head of Football Development, Joaquin "Kino" Garcia Sanchez.

On 1 September, the club entered into a 3-year international partnership deal with Premier League club Watford.

Training
Similar to the last season, the 2021–22 Indian Super League season will also be hosted behind closed doors across three venues in Goa due to the COVID-19 pandemic in India. Odisha FC used the Our Lady of the Rosary Church Ground in Navelim, South Goa for their pre-season training. The team started their pre-season training by the end of first week of September 2021. Head coach Ramirez and his team arrived in Goa on 9 September for pre-season.

Transfers
On 22 April 2021, Odisha announced the contract extension of Jerry Mawihmingthanga till 2022. On 14 May, Odisha announced the signing of Sebastian Thangmuansang on a two-year contract from I-League side Gokulam Kerala FC. The club also announced the signing of Sahil Panwar on a two-year contract by paying a undisclosed transfer fee to Indian Super League side Hyderabad FC. On 8 June, the club announced the signing of defender Lalruatthara on a two-year deal.

On 7 July, Odisha announced the signing of Isaac Vanmalsawma on a two-year contract. On 12 July, the club announced that George D'Souza joined I-League 2nd Division club FC Bengaluru United on loan for the 2021–22 season.

On 23 July, Cole Alexander mutually terminated his contract with the club after agreeing to leave Odisha for South African Premier Division club, Kaizer Chiefs, at an undisclosed fee.

On 26 July, the club announced the signing of Spanish centre-back Víctor Mongil as its first foreign signing of the season. On 30 July, Odisha announced the signing of Spanish attacking-midfielder Javi Hernández.

On 5 August, the club announced the signing of Nikhil Raj on loan from Bangalore Super Division club Kickstart. On 11 August, Odisha announced the signing of Spanish centre-back Héctor Rodas. On 16 August, the club announced the signing of Spanish centre-forward and winger Aridai Cabrera. On 23 August, Odisha announced the signing of its AFC-quota player, midfielder Liridon Krasniqi, on loan from Johor Darul Ta'zim.

On 7 September, Odisha announced that 7 players from their youth setup were called up to the first team for trials at the pre-season training camp in Goa. On 9 September, Odisha announced the signing of Brazilian centre-forward Jonathas de Jesus from UAE Pro League-side Sharjah.

In

Out

Out-on-Loan

Contract Extensions

Pre-season and friendlies

Competitions

Overview

Indian Super League

League table

Result summary

Matches
The league fixtures were announced on 13 September 2021.

Personnel

Current technical staff

Football Sport Management

Management

Board of Directors

Statistics

Appearances and goals

|-
! colspan=12 style=text-align:center| Goalkeepers

|-
! colspan=12 style=text-align:center| Defenders
|-

|-
! colspan=12 style=text-align:center| Midfielders
|-

|-
! colspan=12 style=text-align:center| Forwards
|-

|-

Goal scorers

Source: Indian Super League

Clean sheets

Source: Indian Super League

Disciplinary record

Source: Indian Super League

References

Odisha FC seasons
2021–22 Indian Super League season by team